Oedura bella, sometimes called the gulf marbled velvet gecko, is a species of geckos endemic to Queensland and Northern Territory in  Australia.

References

Oedura
Geckos of Australia
Reptiles described in 2016
Taxa named by Paul M. Oliver
Taxa named by Paul Doughty
IUCN Red List least concern species